Kingsley Ben-Adir (born 28 February 1986) is a British actor. He has performed in several plays in London theatres. He played pathologist Marcus Summer in ITV's detective drama Vera and private detective Karim Washington on the second season of the Netflix series The OA. From 2017 to 2019, he appeared in series four and five of the BBC One television series Peaky Blinders. In 2020, he starred as Malcolm X in the Amazon Studios film One Night in Miami... (2020).

Early life and education 
Ben-Adir was born in Gospel Oak, London, England, to a black Trinidadian mother and a white British father. He attended William Ellis School in Gospel Oak, Northwest London. He graduated from the Guildhall School of Music and Drama in 2011. He, alongside his mother and brother, converted to Judaism.

Career 
In 2011, Ben-Adir performed in Gillian Slovo's critically acclaimed play The Riots at the Tricycle Theatre. In 2012, he played Demetrius in A Midsummer Night's Dream at Regent's Park Open Air Theatre.

In 2013, he played Borachio in Mark Rylance's production of Much Ado About Nothing at the Old Vic in London and also played in God's Property at the Soho Theatre.

In 2014, Ben-Adir performed in the play We Are Proud to Present a Presentation About the Herero of Namibia, Formerly Known as Southwest Africa, From the German Sudwestafrika, Between the Years 1884–1915 at the Bush Theatre in London. The play received positive reviews.

From 2017 to 2019, Ben-Adir appeared in series four and five of the BBC One television series Peaky Blinders, playing the role of Colonel Ben Younger.

In 2020, Ben-Adir starred as Malcolm X in the Amazon Studios film One Night in Miami... directed by Regina King. Ben-Adir starred alongside Eli Goree (Cassius Clay), Leslie Odom Jr. (Sam Cooke), and Aldis Hodge (Jim Brown).

In March 2021, Deadline Hollywood reported that Ben-Adir had joined the Secret Invasion series for Marvel Studios as the main villain.

In February 2022, Ben-Adir was set to play Bob Marley in its untitled biopic directed by Reinaldo Marcus Green. In April 2022, he joined the ensemble cast of Barbie movie.

Acting credits

Film

Television

Theatre

Awards and nominations

References

External links
 

1986 births
21st-century English male actors
Alumni of the Guildhall School of Music and Drama
Black British male actors
English male stage actors
English male film actors
English male television actors
English male video game actors
English people of Trinidad and Tobago descent
English Jews
Living people
People from the London Borough of Camden
Chopard Trophy for Male Revelation winners